Brett Hextall (born April 2, 1988) is an American-born Canadian former professional ice hockey player and current coach, who played four seasons in the American Hockey League (AHL) for the Portland Pirates and Lehigh Valley Phantoms.

Playing career
Hextall was drafted by the Phoenix Coyotes in the sixth round (159th overall) of the 2008 NHL Entry Draft.

In April 2011, the Coyotes signed Hextall to an entry level contract.  He played the next three seasons for the Portland Pirates, the Coyotes' AHL affiliate. Following the 2013–14 season, the Coyotes did not make a qualifying offer to Hextall, allowing him to become an unrestricted free agent.

On August 25, 2014, the Lehigh Valley Phantoms signed Hextall to a one-year AHL contract. He retired following the season.

Coaching career 
Hextall joined the Philadelphia Flyers coaching staff in 2017. He served as a player development coach until 2020, before moving to the Pittsburgh Penguins in 2021 as an integrated development coach working under his father and Penguins general manager, Ron Hextall.

Personal life
Hextall is the son of former NHL goaltender and current general manager of the Pittsburgh Penguins Ron Hextall (and grandson of Bryan Jr. and great-grandson of Bryan Sr.). Brett studied at the University of North Dakota, just like his great-uncle Dennis.

Hextall currently lives in Iowa City with his wife Mamie, who is a resident doctor.

Career statistics

Notable awards and honors
WCHA All-Academic Team (2009–10, 2010–11).

References

External links

1988 births
Living people
American men's ice hockey forwards
Arizona Coyotes draft picks
Lehigh Valley Phantoms players
North Dakota Fighting Hawks men's ice hockey players
Philadelphia Flyers coaches
Portland Pirates players